Christopher Knight is an author who has written several books dealing with theories such as 366-degree geometry and has argued in favour of the origins of Freemasonry being based on the rituals once used by the Order of the Knights Templar.

In an interview about the book Who Built the Moon?: 2005 Knight stated that, as many scientists have observed, the moon does not appear to be a natural object. Knight has stated that he believes there are three possible causes, including the idea that it could have been built by humans with a message in "base ten arithmetic so it looks as though it is directed to a ten digit species that is living on Earth right now – which seems to mean humans."

Books
Co-authored with Robert Lomas:
 The Hiram Key.  1996, Century.  
 The Second Messiah.  1997, Century.  
 The Holy Grail (Mysteries of the Ancient World).  1997, Weidenfeld and Nicolson.  
 Uriel's Machine.  1999, Century.  
 The Book Of Hiram.  2003, Century.  

Co-authored with Alan Butler
 Civilization One.  1999, Watkins Publishing.  
 Who Built the Moon?.  2005, Watkins Publishing.  
 Solomon's Power Brokers.  2007, Watkins Publishing.  
 Before the Pyramids. 2009, Watkins Publishing.  
 The Hiram Key Revisited. 2010, Watkins Publishing.

See also
Archaeoastronomy

References

British writers
Pseudohistorians
Living people
Year of birth missing (living people)